David John Rutherford (born 6 April 1976) is an English cricketer.  Rutherford is a left-handed batsman who bowls right-arm fast-medium.  He was born in Ashington, Northumberland.

Rutherford made his debut for Northumberland in the 1996 Minor Counties Championship against Buckinghamshire.  Rutherford has played Minor counties cricket for Northumberland from 1996 to present, which has included 73 Minor Counties Championship matches and 48 MCCA Knockout Trophy matches.  He made his List A debut against Ireland in the 1999 NatWest Trophy.  He played 6 further List A matches, the last coming against Leicestershire in the 2003 Cheltenham & Gloucester Trophy.  In his 7 List A matches, he scored 40 runs at a batting average of 10.00, with a high score of 14*.  With the ball he took 4 wickets at a bowling average of 68.25, with best figures of 2/33.

He also played Second XI cricket for the Durham Second XI and the Northamptonshire Second XI.

References

External links
David Rutherford at ESPNcricinfo
David Rutherford at CricketArchive

1976 births
Living people
Sportspeople from Ashington
Cricketers from Northumberland
English cricketers
Northumberland cricketers